Gorleston Links was a railway station in Gorleston, England. It was located on an embankment to the north of Links Road and to the south west of the end of Hill Avenue. The tracks southward crossed Links Road by bridge.

Gorleston Links was opened in July 1914 to serve the adjacent golf course . The station was closed four years later as a post-war economy measure, but later reopened in 1919, this time as a result of the increasing number of holiday makers visiting the area. Initially named "Gorleston Links Halt", the station was renamed just "Gorleston Links" in 1968, merely two years before its eventual closure.

The area where the station was situated has changed greatly in the years since 1970; residential redevelopment has led to the removal of the bridge and embankment, leaving no trace of the former halt.

The route of the railway line south of Gorleston Links ran almost parallel with the A12 (Lowestoft Road) to Station Road in Hopton, which was the location of Hopton railway station.

References

External links
 Gorleston Links station on 1946 O.S. map

Disused railway stations in Norfolk
Former Norfolk and Suffolk Joint Railway stations
Railway stations in Great Britain opened in 1914
Railway stations in Great Britain closed in 1918
Railway stations in Great Britain opened in 1919
Railway stations in Great Britain closed in 1970
Gorleston-on-Sea
Beeching closures in England